This article contains a list of presidents of Chile from the establishment of the first government junta in 1810, at the beginning of the Chilean War of Independence, to the present day.

Patria Vieja (1810–1814)

Government Juntas (1810–1814)

Supreme directors (1814)

Reconquest (1814–1817)

Patria Nueva (1817–1826)

Supreme directors (1817–1826)

Presidents (1826–present)

Organization of the Republic (1826–1830)

Conservative Republic (1830–1861)

Liberal Republic (1861–1891)

Parliamentary Republic (1891–1925)

Presidential Republic (1925–1932)

Socialist Republic of Chile (1932)

Presidential Republic (1932–1973)

Military rule (1973–1990)

Presidential Republic (1990–present)

Timeline

See also 
President of Chile
Presidents of Chile timeline
Vice President of Chile
Politics of Chile
List of government juntas of Chile
Lists of incumbents

Notes

Chile
Presidents
Presidents
Presidents